Thaine Carter (born May 19, 1987) is a professional Canadian football linebacker who is currently a free agent. He most recently played for the Winnipeg Blue Bombers of the Canadian Football League. He was drafted by the Blue Bombers in the sixth round of the 2009 CFL Draft. He played CIS football for the Queen's Golden Gaels. Carter won the President's Trophy as the top defensive player in the CIS during the 2008 season.  In 2008, he helped the Gaels to a perfect 8-0 regular season and was named the team's defensive captain.

External links
Queen's Gaels bio

Living people
Players of Canadian football from British Columbia
Canadian football linebackers
Queen's Golden Gaels football players
Sportspeople from Nanaimo
Winnipeg Blue Bombers players
1987 births